Lightning, in comics, may refer to:

Lightning (DC Comics), a DC Comics character
Lightning, one of the duo Thunder and Lightning
Lightning, a member of the T.H.U.N.D.E.R. Agents

It may also refer to:

Well-Spoken Sonic Lightning Flash, a DC Comics character, one of the new forever people.

See also
Lightning Comics (disambiguation)
Lightning (disambiguation)